The Chatham bellbird (Anthornis melanocephala) is an extinct species of bird in the family Meliphagidae. It was endemic to the Chatham Islands.

In appearance it was very similar to the New Zealand bellbird (Anthornis melanura) but was considerably larger. Also the whole of the head and neck was brightly glossed in purplish or steel-blue.

It was last observed in 1906 on Little Mangere Island. The population was likely impacted by the introduction of a disease as there was a sudden population decline before the onset of other disturbances such as rats, cats and specimen collectors.

References

External links
 Chatham Island Bellbird / Komako. by Paul Martinson. Artwork produced for the book Extinct Birds of New Zealand, by Alan Tennyson, Te Papa Press, Wellington, 2006

Anthornis
Extinct birds of the Chatham Islands
Birds described in 1843
Bird extinctions since 1500
Species made extinct by human activities
Species endangered by specimen collection
Species endangered by habitat loss
Species endangered by invasive species
Taxa named by George Robert Gray
Taxonomy articles created by Polbot